Chaughtanoonda Creek flows into the Mohawk River in Hoffmans, New York.

References 

Rivers of Schenectady County, New York
Mohawk River
Rivers of New York (state)